Karle Hammond (born 25 April 1974) is an English former professional rugby league footballer who played in the 1990s and 2000s.

Background
Hammond was born in Widnes, Cheshire, England.

Career

He was the top try-scorer of the 1996 Great Britain Lions tour of Papua New Guinea, Fiji and New Zealand.

Karle Hammond played  in St. Helens' 16-25 defeat by Wigan in the 1995–96 Regal Trophy Final during the 1995–96 at Alfred McAlpine Stadium, Huddersfield on Saturday 13 January 1996.

References

External links
Profile at saints.org.uk
(archived by web.archive.org) Statistics at slstats.org
Hammond hammer blow for Wales

1974 births
Living people
English rugby league players
Great Britain national rugby league team players
Halifax R.L.F.C. players
London Broncos players
Rugby league five-eighths
Rugby league halfbacks
Rugby league hookers
Rugby league locks
Rugby league players from Widnes
Salford Red Devils players
St Helens R.F.C. players
Wales national rugby league team players
Widnes Vikings players